Phaselia is a genus of moths in the family Geometridae erected by Achille Guenée in 1857.

Species
Phaselia serrularia (Eversmann, 1847)
Phaselia narynaria (Oberthür, 1913)
Phaselia erika Ebert, 1965
Phaselia kasyi Wiltshire, 1966
Phaselia algiricaria (Oberthür, 1913)

References

Boarmiini